Badder Than B-Fore: The Remix Album is a remix album released by MC Lyte. The album featured remixed tracks from her 1996 album, Bad As I Wanna B, as well as two additional tracks that did not appear on the album.

Track listing
"Cold Rock a Party" (Mousse T. Mix)		
"Everyday" (Smoothed Over Remix)		
"TRG (The Rap Game)" (Superfly Remix)		
"One On One" (Master Tee Remix)		
"Drug lord Superstar" (MILK. Remix)		
"Have U Ever" (Brooklyn Remix)		
"Keep On, Keepin' On" (JD Remix)		
"Two Seater" (The Conductor's Club Remix)		
"Zodiac" (The Deep Sign Remix)		
"Cold Rock a Party" (Bad Boy Remix)		
"Anthology Mega Mix"		
"Two Seater" (Flavour Remix)		
"I'm Leavin' U (Gotta Go, Gotta Go)" [C & J Full-time Mix]

References

MC Lyte albums
1998 remix albums
East West Records remix albums